The Spanish football league system consists of several professional, semi-professional and non-professional leagues bound together hierarchically by promotion and relegation. The top two tiers of the male league pyramid—Primera División ( La Liga) and Segunda División—are administered by the Liga Nacional de Fútbol Profesional, a sports association with independent legal status from the Royal Spanish Football Federation (RFEF), the governing body of football in Spain. Conversely, the top two tiers of the women's pyramid (Primera División and Segunda División Pro) are administered by the RFEF. The lower tiers (6th and below for the men's pyramid; 5th and below for the female one) are run by the regional federations. In addition to clubs from Spain, and under the purview of the additional provision 17 of the 1990 Law of Sport, Andorran clubs affiliated to a Spanish regional federation are allowed to compete in the system.

The RFEF allows reserve teams to compete in the main league system, as is the case in most European domestic leagues. However, reserve teams are not allowed to compete in the same tier as their senior team, and no reserve team has thus competed in the top flight.

Men

La Liga
La Liga is the highest level in the Spanish football league system and is operated by the Liga Nacional de Fútbol Profesional.

Other professional divisions
Segunda División, also called LaLiga SmartBank is the second highest level in the Spanish football league system and is also operated by the Liga Nacional de Fútbol Profesional.

Semi-professional divisions
The Royal Spanish Football Federation (RFEF) created a new tier to begin in the 2021–22 season placed between the Segunda División and the former Segunda División B which had been created in 1977. The federation officially named the third tier, containing two regionalised groups, the Primera División RFEF.

Below the new Primera División RFEF sits the fourth tier, the Segunda División RFEF, roughly corresponding to the format of Segunda B, other than that the new format has five regionalised groups whereas the old system contained only four, other than in its final season, 2020–21, unique both due to the transition into the new system and complications caused by the COVID-19 pandemic in Spain which led to more teams being included and a complicated format involving 10 localised leagues half the size of the usual groups, followed by 15 sections to determine which teams would go into the second, third, fourth and fifth levels. 

Following the reorganisation, the Tercera División RFEF is the fifth highest level in the Spanish football league system and is operated by the RFEF and 17 regional federations corresponding to each of the autonomous communities of Spain (there are 18 groups – Andalusia is divided into two due to its size). Prior to 2021, this was known as the Tercera División and was the fourth level, but had the same format. In 2020–21 the division also had an atypical format of 36 local subgroups followed by a total of 54 subgroups to allocate promotion, playoff and relegation places.

Lower divisions
From level 6, each of the RFEF's 19 regional federations runs its regional league pyramid under its own jurisdiction.

Pyramid table

Evolution of the Spanish league system

* From 1929 to 1940 the Spanish pyramid was similar to the Brazilian system, two simultaneous and independent pyramids, the national pyramid, and the regional pyramid.

**The Primera and Segunda was founded by the Royal Spanish Football Association, but since 1984 is operated by the Liga Nacional de Fútbol Profesional. Since 2015 the Primera División is commonly known as LigaSantander and the Segunda División is commonly known as Liga SmartBank for sponsorship reasons.

Women

Until 2021–22

Since 2022–23

Youth

References 

Football league systems in Europe
 
football